Raudalu is a subdistrict in the district of Nõmme, Tallinn, the capital of Estonia.

References 

Subdistricts of Tallinn